Shkodër is the fifth-most-populous city of the Republic of Albania and the seat of Shkodër County and Shkodër Municipality. The city sprawls across the Plain of Mbishkodra between the southern part of Lake Shkodër and the foothills of the Albanian Alps on the banks of Buna, Drin and Kir. Due to its proximity to the Adriatic Sea, Shkodër is affected by a seasonal Mediterranean climate with continental influences.

One of the oldest continuously inhabited cities in the Balkans, Shkodër was founded under the name Scodra upon the traditional lands of the Illyrian tribes of the Ardiaei and Labeates in the 4th century BCE. It has historically developed on a  hill strategically located in the outflow of Lake Shkodër into the Buna River. The Romans annexed the city after the third Illyrian War in 168 BCE, when Gentius was defeated by the Roman force of Anicius Gallus. In the 3rd century CE, Shkodër became the capital of Praevalitana, due to the administrative reform of the Roman Emperor Diocletian. With the spread of Christianity in the 4th century CE, the Archdiocese of Scodra was founded and was assumed in 535 by Byzantine Emperor Justinian I.

Shkodër is regarded as the traditional capital of northern Albania, also referred to as Gegëria, and is noted for its arts, culture, religious diversity and turbulent history among the Albanians. The architecture of Shkodër is particularly dominated by mosques and churches reflecting the city's high degree of religious diversity and tolerance. Shkodër was home to many influential personalities, who among others, helped to shape the Albanian Renaissance.

Name 
The city was first attested in calassical sources as the capital of the Illyrian kingdom with the name Skodra (Ancient Greek: Σκόδρα; genitive  "of the Skodrians", appearing on 2nd c. BC coins) and Scodra (Latin form).

Although the ultimate origin of the toponym Σκόδρα Scodra is uncertain, the name is certainly pre-Roman. A Paleo-Balkan origin has been suggested, relating it to the  'hill', and  '(wooded) mountain, forest', with the same root as the ancient toponym Codrio/Kodrion.

The further development of the name has been a subject of discussion among linguists over the exact location of Albanian-speakers in classical antiquity. Linguists Eqrem Çabej and Shaban Demiraj treat the development from Illyrian Σκόδρα Skodra to Albanian Shkodra/Shkodër as evidence of regular development within the Albanian language. Other linguists have argued that Albanian Shkodra/Shkodër fails to display certain known phonological changes that would have to have happened if the name had been continually in use in Proto-Albanian since pre-Roman times, as in that case, it has been claimed that Illyrian Σκόδρα Skodra would have become **Hádër in Albanian, instead of Shkodër. Nevertheless, the evolution of Scodra into Shkodra/Shkodër certainly observes Albanian phonetic rules in the Roman period.

In modern times, the term was adapted to Italian as Scodra and Scutari; in this form it was also in wide use in English until the 20th century. In Serbo-Croatian, Shkodër is known as Skadar, and in Turkish as İşkodra.

History

Early history 

The earliest signs of human activity in the lands of Shkodër can be traced back to the Bronze Age. The favorable conditions on the fertile plain, around the lake, have brought people here from early antiquity. Artefacts and inscriptions, discovered in the Rozafa Castle, are assumed to be the earliest examples of symbolic behaviour in humans in the city. Although, it was known under the name Scodra and was inhabited by the Illyrian tribes of the Labeates and Ardiaei, which ruled over a large territory between modern Albania up to Croatia. King Agron, Queen Teuta and King Gentius, were among the most famous personalities of the Ardiaei.

The city was first mentioned during antiquity as the site of the Illyrian Labeates in which they minted coins and that of Queen Teuta. In 168 BCE, the city was captured by the Romans and became an important trade and military route. The Romans colonized the town. Scodra remained in the province of Illyricum and, later, Dalmatia. By it 395 CE, it was part of the Diocese of Dacia, within Praevalitana.

In the early 11th century, Jovan Vladimir ruled Duklja amidst the war between Basil II and Samuel. Vladimir allegedly retreated into Koplik when Samuel invaded Duklja and was subsequently forced to accept Bulgarian vassalage. He was later slain by the Bulgarians. Shingjon (feast of Jovan Vladimir) has since been celebrated by Albanian Orthodox Christians.

In the 1030s, Stefan Vojislav from Travunija expelled the last strategos and successfully defeated the Byzantines by 1042. Stefan Vojislav set up Shkodër, as his capital. Constantine Bodin accepted the crusaders of the Crusade of 1101 in Shkodër. After the dynastic struggles in the 12th century, Shkodër became an integral part of the Serbian Nemanjić Zeta province. In 1214 the city was briefly annexed to Despotate of Epirus under Michael I Komnenos Doukas. In 1330, Stefan Dečanski, King of Serbia, appointed his son Stefan Dušan as the governor of Zeta with its seat in Shkodër. In the same year Dušan and his father entered the conflict which resulted with campaign of Dečanski who destroyed Dušan's court on Drin River near Shkodër in January 1331. In April 1331, they made a truce, but in August 1331 Dušan went from Shkodër to Nerodimlje and overthrew his father.

During the disintegration of the Serbian Empire, Shkodër was taken by the Balšić family of Zeta, who surrendered the city to the Republic of Venice in 1396, in order to form a protection zone from the Ottoman Empire. During the Venetian rule the city adopted the Statutes of Scutari, a civic law written in Venetian. The Statutes of Scutari mention Albanian and Slavic presence in the city, but under Venetian rule many Dalmatians were brought to Shkodra and as such formed the majority there. After the Black Death killed most of the inhabitants Albanians and Slavs formed the majority in the city. Venetians built the St. Stephen's Church (later converted into the Fatih Sultan Mehmet Mosque by the Ottomans) and the Rozafa Castle. In 1478-79 Mehmed the conqueror laid siege on Shkodër. In 1479 the city fell to the Ottomans and the defenders of the citadel emigrated to Venice, while many Albanians from the region retreated into the mountains. The city then became a seat of a newly established Ottoman sanjak, the Sanjak of Scutari.

Ottoman Period 

With two sieges, Shkodër became secure as an Ottoman territory. It became the centre of the sanjak and by 1485 there were 27 Muslim and 70 Christian hearths, although by the end of the next century there were more than 200 Muslim ones compared to the 27 Christian ones, respectively.

Military manoeuvres in 1478 by the Ottomans meant that the city was again entirely surrounded by Ottoman forces. Mehmed the Conqueror personally laid the siege. About ten heavy cannons were cast on site. Nevertheless, the city resisted. Mehmed left the field and had his commanders continue the siege. By the winter the Ottomans had captured one after the other all adjacent castles: Lezhë, Drisht and Žabljak Crnojevića. This, together with famine and constant bombardment lowered the morale of defenders. On the other hand, the Ottomans were already frustrated by the stubborn resistance. The castle is situated on a naturally protected hill and every attempted assault resulted in considerable casualties for the attackers. A truce became an option for both parties. On January 25 an agreement between the Venetians and the Ottoman Empire ended the siege, permitting the citizens to leave unharmed, and the Ottomans to take over the deserted city.

After Ottoman domination was secure, much of the population fled. Around the 17th century, the city began to prosper as the centre of the Sanjak of Scutari (sanjak was an Ottoman administrative unit smaller than a vilayet). It became the economic centre of northern Albania, its craftsmen producing fabric, silk, arms and silver artifacts.

Shkodër was a major city under Ottoman rule in southeast Europe. It retained its importance up until the end of the empire's rule in the Balkans in the early 20th century. This is due to its geo-strategic position that connects it directly with the Adriatic and with the Italian ports, but also with land-routes to the other important Ottoman centre, namely Prizren. The city was an important meeting place of diverse cultures from other parts of the Empire, as well as influences coming westwards, by Italian merchants. It was a centre of Islam in the region, producing many ulema, poets and administrators, particularly from the Bushati family.
In the 18th century Shkodër became the centre of the (pashaluk) of Shkodër, under the rule of the Bushati family, which ruled from 1757 to 1831. Shkodër's importance as a trade centre in the second half of the 19th century was owed to the fact that it was the centre of the vilayet of Shkodër, and an important trading centre for the entire Balkan peninsula. It had over 3,500 shops, and clothing, leather, tobacco and gunpowder were some of the major products of Shkodër. A special administration was established to handle trade, a trade court, and a directorate of postage services with other countries. Other countries had opened consulates in Shkodër ever since 1718. Obot and Ulcinj served as ports for Shkodër, and, later on, Shëngjin (San Giovanni di Medua). The Jesuit seminary and the Franciscan committee were opened in the 19th century.

Following the rebellion of Mustafa Pasha Bushatlliu Shkodër was sieged by the Ottomans for more than 6 months who finally managed to break the Albanian resistance in 10 November 1831. In 1833 around 4,000 Albanian rebels seized the town again holding off the Ottoman forces between April and December and even sending a delegation to Istanbul until the Ottoman government finally gave in to their terms giving an end to the rebellion.

Before 1867 Shkodër (İşkodra) was a sanjak of Rumelia Eyalet in Ottoman Empire. In 1867, Shkodër sanjak merged with Skopje (Üsküp) sanjak and became Shkodër vilayet. Shkodër vilayet was split into Shkodër, Prizren and Dibra sanjaks. In 1877, Prizren passed to Kosovo vilayet and Debar passed to Monastir vilayet, while Durrës township became a sanjak. In 1878 Bar and Podgorica townships belonged to Montenegro. Ottoman-Albanian intellectual Sami Frashëri during the 1880s estimated the population of Shkodër as numbering 37,000 inhabitants that consisted of three quarters being Muslims and the rest Christians made up of mostly Catholics and a few hundred Orthodox. In 1900, Shkodër vilayet was split into Shkodër and Durrës sanjaks.

Modern

Shkodër played an important role during the League of Prizren, the Albanian liberation movement. The people of Shkodër participated in battles to protect Albanian land. The branch of the League of Prizren for Shkodër, which had its own armed unit, fought for the protection of Plav, Gusinje, Hoti and Gruda, and the war for the protection of Ulcinj. The Bushati Library, built during the 1840s, served as a centre for the League of Prizren's branch for Shkodër. Many books were collected in libraries of Catholic missionaries working in Shkodër. Literary, cultural and sports associations were formed, such as Bashkimi ("The Union") and Agimi ("The Dawn"). The first Albanian newspapers and publications printed in Albania came out of the printing press of Shkodër. The Marubi family of photographers began working in Shkodër, which left behind over 150,000 negatives from the period of the Albanian liberation movement, the rise of the Albanian flag in Vlorë, and life in Albanian towns during the end of the 19th and the beginning of the 20th century.

During the Balkan Wars, Shkodër went from one occupation to another, when the Ottomans were defeated by the Kingdom of Montenegro. The Ottoman forces led by Hasan Riza Pasha and Esad Pasha had resisted for seven months the surrounding of the town by Montenegrin forces and their Serbian allies. Esad (Hasan had previously been mysteriously killed by Esad Pasha Toptani in an ambush inside the town) finally surrendered to Montenegro in April 1913, after Montenegro suffered a high death toll with more than 10,000 casualties. Edith Durham also notes the cruelties suffered at the hand of Montenegrins in the wake of October 1913: "Thousands of refugees arriving from Djakovo and neighbourhood. Victims of Montenegro. My position was indescribably painful, for I had no funds left, and women came to me crying: 'If you will not feed my child, throw it in the river. I cannot see it starve.'" Montenegro was compelled to leave the city to the new country of Albania in May 1913, in accordance with the London Conference of Ambassadors.

During World War I, Montenegrin forces again occupied Shkodër on 27 June 1915. In January 1916, Shkodër was taken over by Austria-Hungary and was the centre of the zone of their occupation. When the war ended on 11 November 1918, French forces occupied Shkodër as well as other regions with sizable Albanian populations. After World War I, the international military administration of Albania was temporarily located in Shkodër, and in March 1920, Shkodër was put under the administration of the national government of Tirana. In the second half of 1920, Shkodër resisted another threat, the military intervention of the forces of the Kingdom of Serbs, Croats and Slovenes.

Shkodër was the centre of democratic movements of the years 1921–1924. The democratic opposition won the majority of votes for the Constitutional Assembly, and on 31 May 1924, the democratic forces took over the town and from Shkodër headed to Tirana. From 1924 to 1939, Shkodër had a slow industrial development, small factories that produced food, textile and cement were opened. From 43 of such in 1924, the number rose to 70 in 1938. In 1924, Shkodër had 20,000 inhabitants, the number grew to 29,000 in 1938. During September 1928, Albania was proclaimed a monarchy by King Zog I. He was a self-made Muslim monarch and the king of all Albanians until 1939. After 1939, Zog went into exile and Victor Emmanuel III became the king of the Albanians. Shortly after World War II, Emmanuel was formally abdicated in 1946. In 1945, Enver Hoxha established communism in Albania.

Shkodër was the seat of a Catholic archbishopric and had a number of religious schools. The first laic school was opened here in 1913, and the State Gymnasium was opened in 1922. It was the centre of many cultural associations. In sports Shkodër was the first city in Albania to constitute a sports association, the "Vllaznia" (brotherhood). Vllaznia Shkodër is the oldest sport club in Albania.

During the early 1990s, Shkodër was once again a major centre, this time of the democratic movement that finally brought to an end the communist regime established by Enver Hoxha. In the later 2000s (decade), the city experiences a rebirth as main streets are being paved, buildings painted and streets renamed. In December 2010, Shkodër and the surrounding region was hit by probably the worst flooding in the last 100 years. In 2011, a new swing bridge over the Buna River was constructed, thus replacing the old bridge nearby.

Geography 

Shkodër extends strategically on the Mbishkodra Plain between the Lake of Shkodër and the foothills of the Albanian Alps, which forms the southern continuation of the Dinaric Alps. Shkodër is trapped on three sides by Kir in the east, Drin in the south and Buna in the west. Rising from the Lake of Shkodër, Buna flows into the Adriatic Sea, forming the border with Montenegro. In the east, Shkodër is bordered by Kir, which originates from the north flowing also into the Drin, that surrounds Shkodër in the south.

Lake Shkodër lies in the west of the city and forms the frontier of Albania and Montenegro. The lake became the symbol of the stable and consistent economic and social divide of the city. Although, the lake is the largest lake in Southern Europe and an important habitat for various animal and plant species. Further, the Albanian section has been designated as a nature reserve. In 1996, it also has been recognised as a wetland of international importance by designation under the Ramsar Convention. River Buna connects the lake with the Adriatic Sea, while the Drin provides a link with Lake Ohrid in the southeast of Albania. It is a cryptodepression, filled by the river Morača and drained into the Adriatic by the  Buna.

Climate 

Shköder has a hot-summer Mediterranean climate (Csa) under the Köppen climate classification, that is almost wet enough in July to be a humid subtropical climate with continental influences.

Governance 

Shkodër is a municipality governed by a mayor–council system with the mayor of Shkodër and the members of Shkodër Municipal Council responsible for the administration of Shkodër Municipality. The municipality is encompassed in Shkodër County within the Northern Region of Albania and consists of the administrative units of Ana e Malit, Bërdicë, Dajç, Guri i Zi, Postribë, Pult, Rrethinat, Shalë, Shosh, Velipojë and Shkodër as its seat.

International relations 

Shkodër is twinned with:

 Cetinje, Montenegro
 Knin, Croatia
 Pécs, Hungary
 Üsküdar, Turkey
 Zeytinburnu, Turkey

Economy 

The main activities of the processing industry in Shkodra were the processing of tobacco and manufacture of cigarettes, production of preserved foods, sugar-based foods, soft and alcoholic drinks, and pasta, bread, rice and vegetable oil. The main activities of the textile industry were focused on garments and silk products. The city also had a wood-processing and paper-production plant. The most important mechanical engineering industries concerned wire manufacturing, elevator manufacturing, bus assembly and the Drini Plant.

According to the World Bank, Shkodër has had significant steps of improving the economy in recent years. In 2016, Shkodër ranked 8 among 22 cities in southeastern Europe.

As the largest city in northern Albania, the city is the main road connection between the Albanian capital, Tirana and Montenegrin capital Podgorica. The SH1 leads to the Albanian–Montenegrin border at Han i Hotit border crossing. From Tirana at the Kamza Bypass northward, it passes through Fushë-Kruja, Milot, Lezha, Shkodra and Koplik. The road segment between Hani i Hotit at the Montenegrin border and Shkodra was completed in 2013 as a single carriageway standard. Shkodër Bypass started after the 2010 Albania floods. It was planned to incorporate a defensive dam against Shkodër Lake but works were abandoned a few years later. The road continues as a single carriageway down to Milot and contains some uncontrolled and dangerous entry and exit points. The SH5 starts from Shkodër to Morinë.

Demography 

Shkodër is the fourth-most-populous city and fifth-most-populous municipality in Albania. As of the 2011 census, the municipal unit of Shkodër had an estimated population of 77,075 of whom 37,630 were men and 39,445 women. The population of the municipality was 135,612 in 2011.

The 20th century found Shkodër with a population of around 30,000 to 40,000. After Albanian Independence in 1912 the city numbered 23,000 inhabitants. Surveys in 1926–27 showed the city not to have experienced any relative growth, a figure of 23,784 inhabitants being given, which was the same figure as confirmed for the data of the population census of 1918, according to which Shkodër in 1918 had a population of 23,099.

In 1918, the majority—two thirds—of the population was Muslim and one third was Catholic with a small community of Orthodox faith of Slavic and Vlah origin who immigrated to Shkodër during the 19th century. The city was divided into 12 mahallas, of which nine were inhabited by the Muslim and three by the Catholic population, and a separated bazaar. The Muslims were mostly to be found in the quarters on the west side of the city while the Catholics were living in the quarters on the east side of the city. The Orthodox population mostly lived within the Muslim quarters.

The city of Shkodër was one of the most important centres for Islamic scholars and cultural and literary activity in Albania. Here stands the site of the only institution in Albania which provides high-level education in Arabic, Turkish and Islamic Studies.
Shkodër is the centre of Roman Catholicism in Albania. The Roman Catholic Church is represented in Shkodër by the episcopal seat of the Metropolitan Roman Catholic Archdiocese of Shkodër-Pult (Scutari-Pulati) in Shkodër Cathedral, with the current seat of the prelacy.

Culture 

Shkodër is referred to as the capital and cultural cradle of northern Albania, also known as Gegëria, for having been the birthplace and home of notable individuals, who among others contributed to the Albanian Renaissance. Most of the inhabitants of Shkodër speak a distinctive dialect of northwestern Gheg Albanian that differs from other Albanian dialects. Shkodër has also a long tradition in the development of the urban music of Albania, marked by a characteristic use of instrumentation and a style of composition.

Rozafa Castle has played an instrumental role in Shkodër's history as the residence of Illyrian monarchs and a military stronghold. Located in the south of Shkodër, its foundations are associated with a legend about a woman who sacrificed herself so the castle could be constructed. Historical Museum of Shkodër is the most important museum in Shkodër and was founded to protect artefacts from all over the region of Shkodër, thus displaying their cultural and historical value. It is housed inside a monumental mansion from the 19th century, collectively known as the house of Oso Kuka. The expanded Marubi National Museum of Photography located on the Kolë Idromeno Street displays an extensive visual collection of Albanian social, cultural and political life beginning from 1850 on its galleries.

Shkodër's architecture and urban development are historically and culturally significant for northern Albania. It was and is inhabited by many people of different cultures and religions with many of them leaving mark of their cultural heritage. The Ebu Beker Mosque, Fatih Sultan Mehmet Mosque, Franciscan Church, Lead Mosque, Nativity Cathedral and St. Stephen's Cathedral are the most eminent religious buildings of Shkodër. Other major monuments include the Drisht Castle, Mesi Bridge and ruins of Shurdhah Island.

The Vllaznia club is a professional Albanian soccer team dedicated to Shkoder. It one of the most well-known teams in Albania.

See also 
 List of settlements in Illyria
 List of mayors of Shkodër
 List of people from Shkodër

Notes

References

Bibliography

External links 

bashkiashkoder.gov.alOfficial Website 

 
Cities in Albania
Municipalities in Shkodër County
Administrative units of Shkodër
Gegëri
Illyrian Albania
Cities in ancient Illyria
Territories of the Republic of Venice
Former capitals of Montenegro
Populated places established in the 4th century BC